Living Out Loud is a 1998 American comedy-drama film written and directed by Richard LaGravenese and set in New York City, starring Holly Hunter, Danny DeVito, Queen Latifah, Martin Donovan, and Elias Koteas.

Plot

Judith Moore had what she thought was a perfect marriage, with both her and her husband studying to be doctors. But after she puts her studies on hold to find a job and support them, many years pass until suddenly he leaves Judith to be with another doctor. Depressed, she holes up in her apartment, where the middle-aged Pat Francato serves as a building superintendent and elevator operator. He is as lonely as she is, beset with gambling problems, and Judith and Pat make a connection. Yet what he wishes to pursue as a romantic relationship, Judith sees only as a friendship. Her friend Liz Bailey, who sings at a nightclub, makes attempts to improve Judith's love life as well as her own.

Cast
 Holly Hunter as Judith Moore
 Danny DeVito as Pat Francato
 Queen Latifah as Liz Bailey
 Martin Donovan as Robert Nelson
 Elias Koteas as The Kisser
 Richard Schiff as Philly Francato
 Mariangela Pino as Donna
 Suzanne Shepherd as Mary
 Eddie Cibrian as The Masseur
 Tamlyn Tomita as Mrs. Nelson

Reception
Living Out Loud received mixed reviews from critics. On Rotten Tomatoes the film has an approval rating of 59% rating based on 34 reviews. The site's consensus states: "Unoriginal, with one-dimensional characters." On Metacritic the film has a weighted average score of 64% based on reviews from 24 critics. Audiences surveyed by CinemaScore gave the film a grade "B−" on scale of A to F.

Roger Ebert of the Chicago Sun-Times gave the film three and a half stars and wrote that he enjoyed that the movie provided "the comfort of these lives flowing briefly in the same stream. The sense that the unexpected was free to enter the story, and would not be shouldered aside by the demands of conventional plotting."  Ebert gave particular praise to writer and director Richard LaGravenese, who he wrote is "more interested in characters and dialogue than in shaping everything into a conventional story.  He aims for the kind of bittersweet open ends that life itself so often supplies; he doesn't hammer his square pegs into round holes." Mark Caro of the Chicago Tribune also gave the film a positive review, but noted that the "story also has a tendency to wander, which enhances the slice-of-life feel but at the expense of the movie feeling fully formed."  The New York Times critic Janet Maslin was less favorable, writing that LaGravenese "has borrowed from Chekhov the soul-baring introspection that can be so ineffable on the page or stage yet becomes so damply sensitive and dramatically vague on the screen" and, in describing some of the "wild flights of fancy springing from Judith's imagination," observed that "free-spirited as the film hopes to be, it can't easily reconcile such flamboyant departures with an otherwise static pace." Maslin credited Latifah as the film's "one big saving grace," and also offered praise for DeVito for "turning Pat into a three-dimensional figure and singing They Can't Take That Away from Me with brio on the nightclub's amateur night."

References

External links
 
 
 

1998 films
1998 comedy-drama films
American comedy-drama films
1990s English-language films
Films directed by Richard LaGravenese
Films scored by George Fenton
Films set in New York City
Films produced by Danny DeVito
New Line Cinema films
1998 directorial debut films
1990s American films